Four ships of the Royal Navy have been named HMS Vigo, after the Battle of Vigo Bay.

She was captured by the French in 1695, retaken in 1702 and renamed HMS Vigo, and was wrecked in 1703.
 was a 74-gun third-rate launched in 1810, used as a receiving ship from 1827, and broken up in 1865.
She was reduced to harbour service in 1848, renamed HMS Vigo in 1865 and was sold in 1884.
HMS Vigo was to have been an Admiralty modified W-class destroyer. She was cancelled in December 1918.
 was a  launched in 1945 and broken up 1964.

Royal Navy ship names